Sergio Moreno Martínez (born 1 January 1999) is a Spanish professional footballer who plays as a forward for CA Osasuna B, on loan from Rayo Vallecano.

Club career
Born in Pamplona, Navarre, Moreno finished his formation with Rayo Vallecano, after spells at CD Tenerife, Atlético Madrid and RSD Alcalá. He made his senior debut with the reserves on 14 January 2018, playing the last 36 minutes in a 0–1 Tercera División home loss against Getafe CF B.

Moreno scored his first senior goals on 29 April 2018, netting a brace in a 2–0 home defeat of AD Colmenar Viejo. He made his first team – and La Liga – debut on 25 August 2018, coming on as a late substitute for fellow debutant Álvaro García in a 0–1 away loss against Atlético Madrid.

On 2 September 2019, Moreno moved to another reserve team, Valencia CF Mestalla in Segunda División B, on a one-year loan deal. On 5 October of the following year, he moved to Segunda División side CD Mirandés also in a temporary deal.

Moreno scored his first professional goal on 7 November 2020, netting the game's only in a home success over Sporting de Gijón. He returned to Rayo the following July, but after only two cup appearances, he moved out on loan to SD Amorebieta in the second division on 18 January 2022.

On 30 August 2022, Moreno was loaned to Primera Federación side CA Osasuna B, for one year.

Career statistics

Club

References

External links

Sergio Moreno at Eurosport

1999 births
Living people
Footballers from Pamplona
Spanish footballers
Association football forwards
La Liga players
Primera Federación players
Segunda División players
Segunda División B players
Tercera División players
Rayo Vallecano B players
Rayo Vallecano players
Valencia CF Mestalla footballers
CD Mirandés footballers
SD Amorebieta footballers
CA Osasuna B players